John "Tiger" Louis (born 14 June 1941) is an England international Motorcycle speedway rider who rode for Ipswich, Newport, West Ham, Oxford, Wembley, Halifax and King's Lynn during his career. He is the father of Great Britain International Chris Louis.

Career history
Ipswich born Louis started his motorcycling career in scrambling and was tempted to have a go at speedway when Ipswich re-opened in 1969. He made his debut in 1970 and by the following year topped the national Second Division averages. In 1972 Ipswich gained admission to the top flight by purchasing West Ham's licence and Louis spearheaded the Witches team, making his World Final debut at London's Wembley Stadium in 1972, finishing in 5th place.

Louis finished fourth at the 1974 World Final at the Ullevi Stadium in Gothenburg, Sweden and improved to third in the 1975 World Final at Wembley - becoming the first British rider to stand on the World Championship podium since Peter Craven in 1962.  Louis was part of the Great Britain Speedway World Team Cup winning team of 1972 and England's 1974 and 1975 winning teams.

John Louis was World Pairs Champion in 1976 with Malcolm Simmons and finished sixth in his last World Final appearance in Poland. He also captained Ipswich to the British League title in 1975 and 1976. Louis was also the British Champion in 1975 (Chris Louis would win the British Championship in 1998 and 2000 making them the first father-son to do so).

He was British League Division Two Riders Champion in 1971 and British League Riders Champion in 1979. In 1981 Louis joined Halifax, spending two seasons at The Shay before signing for a season at King's Lynn in 1983. He retired from riding in 1984 and is now the promoter of the Ipswich Witches.

He retired as the promoter of Ipswich in 2019.

World Final Appearances

Individual World Championship
 1972 –  London, Wembley Stadium – 5th – 11pts
 1974 –  Gothenburg, Ullevi – 4th – 9pts
 1975 –  London, Wembley Stadium – 3rd – 12pts + 3pts
 1976 –  Chorzów, Silesian Stadium – 6th – 9pts

World Pairs Championship
 1975 –  Wrocław, Olympic Stadium (with Peter Collins) – 4th – 20pts (13)
 1976 –  Eskilstuna, Eskilstuna Motorstadion (with Malcolm Simmons) – Winner – 27pts (17)

World Team Cup
 1972* –  Olching, Olching Speedwaybahn (with Ivan Mauger / Ray Wilson / Terry Betts) Winner – 36pts (9)
 1974 –  Chorzów, Silesian Stadium (with Peter Collins / Malcolm Simmons / Dave Jessup) Winner – 42pts (12)
 1975 –  Norden, Motodrom Halbemond (with Malcolm Simmons / Martin Ashby / Peter Collins) – Winner – 41pts (8)
* 1972 for Great Britain. All others for England.

References

External links
John Louis – Celebrating 40 years in speedway

1941 births
Living people
British speedway riders
British Speedway Championship winners
Speedway promoters
Sportspeople from Ipswich
Speedway World Pairs Champions
Ipswich Witches riders
King's Lynn Stars riders
Halifax Dukes riders
Wembley Lions riders
Oxford Cheetahs riders
Newport Wasps riders
West Ham Hammers riders